Neanotis is a genus of flowering plants belonging to the family Rubiaceae, and the major group Angiosperms.

Its native range is Tropical and Subtropical Asia.

Species
Species:

Neanotis boerhavioides 
Neanotis calycina 
Neanotis carnosa 
Neanotis decipiens 
Neanotis formosana 
Neanotis gracilis 
Neanotis hirsuta 
Neanotis hondae 
Neanotis indica 
Neanotis ingrata 
Neanotis kwangtungensis 
Neanotis lancifolia 
Neanotis latifolia 
Neanotis longiflora 
Neanotis monosperma 
Neanotis montholonii 
Neanotis nana 
Neanotis nummularia 
Neanotis nummulariiformis 
Neanotis oxyphylla 
Neanotis pahompokae 
Neanotis prainiana 
Neanotis rheedei 
Neanotis rhombicarpa 
Neanotis richardiana 
Neanotis ritchiei 
Neanotis sahyadrica 
Neanotis subtilis 
Neanotis thwaitesiana 
Neanotis trichoclada 
Neanotis trimera 
Neanotis tubulosa 
Neanotis urophylla 
Neanotis wightiana

References

Rubiaceae
Rubiaceae genera